The 1992 All-Ireland Junior Hurling Championship was the 71st staging of the All-Ireland Junior Championship since its establishment by the Gaelic Athletic Association in 1912. The championship began on 3 May and ended on 30 August 1992.

Tipperary entered the championship as the defending champions, however, they were beaten by Cork in the Munster semi-final.

The All-Ireland final replay was played on 30 August 1992 at Walsh Park in Waterford, between Wexford and Cork, in what was their first ever meeting in a final. Wexford won the match by 0-13 to 1-08 to claim their second championship title overall and a first title since 1985.

Cork's Christy Clancy was the championship's top scorer with 0-32.

Results

Leinster Junior Hurling Championship

Leinster quarter-finals

Leinster semi-finals

Leinster final

Munster Junior Hurling Championship

Munster first round

Munster semi-finals

Munster final

Ulster Junior Hurling Championship

Ulster quarter-finals

Ulster semi-finals

Ulster final

All-Ireland Junior Hurling Championship

All-Ireland semi-finals

All-Ireland finals

Championship statistics

Top scorers

Top scorers overall

Top scorers in a single game

References

Junior
All-Ireland Junior Hurling Championship